Cumberland Public Library was added to the National Register of Historic Places in 1992 for its significance in architecture, education and social history. It is a Carnegie library.

References

Library buildings completed in 1906
Libraries on the National Register of Historic Places in Wisconsin
Carnegie libraries in Wisconsin
Neoclassical architecture in Wisconsin
National Register of Historic Places in Barron County, Wisconsin
1906 establishments in Wisconsin